Personal Appearance is a 1957 album by Sonny Stitt.

Reception
The original Downbeat review by Ira Gitler awarded the album 5 stars. He wrote "In rating this album five stars, I do not mean to say it is a 'perfect' record.  Timmons plays well, but this is Stitt's album, and he is tremendous. Sonny is all over both his horns, communicating directly and deeply. If you consider yourself a jazz lover, you should own this set."

Track listing
 "You'd Be So Easy to Love" (Cole Porter) – 4:45
 "Easy Living" (Ralph Rainger, Leo Robin) – 4:49
 "Autumn in New York" (Vernon Duke) – 2:20
 "You'd Be So Nice to Come Home To" (Porter) – 4:52
 "For Some Friends" (Sonny Stitt) – 4:44
 "I Never Knew" (Ted Fio Rito, Gus Kahn) – 4:27
 "Between the Devil and the Deep Blue Sea" (Harold Arlen, Ted Koehler) – 5:14
 "East of the Sun (and West of the Moon)" (Brooks Bowman) – 5:30
 "Original?" (Stitt) – 4:33
 "Avalon" (Buddy DeSylva, Al Jolson, Vincent Rose) – 2:55
 "Blues Greasy" (Stitt) – 3:20

Personnel

Performance
 Sonny Stitt - alto saxophone, tenor saxophone
 Bobby Timmons – piano
 Edgar Willis – bass
 Kenny Dennis - drums

References

1957 albums
Sonny Stitt albums
Albums produced by Norman Granz
Verve Records albums